This article contains lists of notable salmon canneries, cannery companies, cannery owners and salmon canning settlements

See also
 List of canneries
 List of canneries in British Columbia

References

 
Salmon